Emma Henriksson (born 18 November 1977) is a Swedish politician. She was a member of the Christian Democrats and was a substitute member of the Riksdag from 2006 to 2010, replacing Mats Odell when he served as Minister for Financial Markets. From 2010 to 2018, Henriksson was a member of the Riksdag by her own. She was chairman of the Riksdag's Committee on Social Affairs since 2014.

She was parliamentary group leader of her party from 2012 to 2015, replacing Mats Odell. She was the second deputy party leader from 2015 to 2017.

External links 
Emma Henriksson at the Riksdag website

Members of the Riksdag from the Christian Democrats (Sweden)
Living people
1977 births
Women members of the Riksdag
21st-century Swedish women politicians
People from Huddinge Municipality